Tuchaqaz (also Romanized as Tūcheqāz and Tūcheqāz; also known as Tūcheghāz and Tūcheh Ghāz) is a village in Haram Rud-e Olya Rural District, in the Central District of Malayer County, Hamadan Province, Iran. At the 2006 census, its population was 2,090, in 573 families.

References 

The best quality cucumbers in Iran

Populated places in Malayer County